Patrick Metzger may refer to:
 Patrick Metzger,  Canadian electoral candidate 2006
Patrick Metzger, music blogger who coined the term Millennial Whoop in 2016
Patrick Metzger, German drummer (born 1979)